Lyces ignorata is a moth of the family Notodontidae first described by Hering in 1925. It is probably endemic to Colombia.

External links
Species page at Tree of Life Web Project

Notodontidae
Moths described in 1925